The South Carolina Mr. Basketball honor recognized the top boys’ high school senior basketball player in the state of South Carolina. The award was presented annually by the Charlotte Observer.

Award winners

Schools with multiple winners

See also
South Carolina Miss Basketball

References

Mr. and Miss Basketball awards
High school sports in South Carolina
Awards established in 1990
1990 establishments in South Carolina
Mr. Basketball
Mr. Basketball